Klemm L 25, later Klemm Kl 25 was a successful German light leisure, sports and training monoplane aircraft, developed in 1928. More than 600 aircraft were built, and manufacturing licenses were sold to the United Kingdom and the United States.

Design and construction
With a low cantilever wing, fixed landing gear, and two open cockpits, the aircraft was developed by Hanns Klemm, who used his previous design, the Daimler L20, as a starting point. It first flew on a  Daimler F7502 engine. The fuselage was covered with plywood.

In relation to similar aircraft of the time, assembly was very easy, and this made it a very popular aircraft. According to the sales brochures, only 25% of the engine's power was needed to keep the aircraft flying, compared to biplanes of the period, which required 50% engine power.

About 600 were built in Germany between 1929 and 1936, serving with various flight training organizations, with either wheels, skis, or floats. 15 were sold to Britain before the Second World War, being fitted with a variety of domestic engines, while 28 more were built by British Klemm Aeroplane Company as the B.A. Swallow. Production in the United States was carried out by the Aeromarine-Klemm Company which enjoyed moderate success, as well as developing models for the American market, in isolation from the parent company, with about 120 built of all models.

Operation
Klemm L 25s took part in many competitions, among others in International Touring Aircraft Competitions (Europa Rundflug) in 1929 (best 4th place) and in 1930 (best 2nd and 3rd places, L 25E variant).

Variants
NB, list not complete

L 25 a Built between 1927 and 1929, equipped with a  Daimler F 7502 engine
L 25 I Built between 1928 and 1929, equipped with a  Salmson AD.9 engine
L 25 Ia
L 25 IWFloatplane version of the Ia, with two wooden floats supported by steel-tube struts in inverted 'W' configuration
L 25 b Built in 1931, equipped with a  Daimler F 7502 engine
L 25 b VII Built in 1931, equipped with a  Hirth HM 60 engine
L 25 d II Built in 1933, equipped with an  Siemens-Halske Sh 13a engine

L 25 d VII Equipped with a  Hirth HM 60R engine
L 25 IVa Equipped with Armstrong Siddeley Genet engine
VL 25 Va Three-seater variant, with a closed canopy, equipped with  Argus As 8 straight engine
L 25 Ve (see L 25E) For Europa Rundflug 1930
L 25E (L 25 Ve) Special competition variant (E for Europa Rundflug 1930), with a closed canopy, smaller span, equipped with a  Argus As 8

British Klemm Aeroplane Company B.K. Swallow
British Aircraft Manufacturing Co. B.A. Swallow II

Aeromarine-Klemm AKL-25
Aeromarine-Klemm AKL-70
Aeromarine-Klemm Model 70 Trainer

Operators

Bolivian Air Force

Royal Hungarian Air Force

Peruvian Air Force

Royal Romanian Air Force

South African Air Force

Specifications (L 25.Ia)

See also

References

Bibliography
 Gerdessen, Frederik. "Estonian Air Power 1918 – 1945". Air Enthusiast, No. 18, April – July 1982. pp. 61–76. .

External links

 Old Rhinebeck Aerodrome's Aeromarine-Klemm AKL-26 page

1920s German civil trainer aircraft
1920s German sport aircraft
Klemm aircraft
Single-engined tractor aircraft
Aircraft first flown in 1928